Thomas Jane (born Thomas Elliott III; February 22, 1969) is an American actor. He is known for appearing in the films Padamati Sandhya Ragam (1987), Boogie Nights (1997), Deep Blue Sea (1999), Under Suspicion (2000), The Punisher (2004), The Mist (2007), Mutant Chronicles (2008), 1922 (2017), and The Predator (2018). Jane's television roles include Mickey Mantle in the television film 61* (2001), and starring in the HBO series Hung (2009–2011) and the Syfy/Amazon Video series The Expanse (2015–2022). He is the founder of RAW Studios, an entertainment company that releases comic books he has written, the first of which was Bad Planet. He made his directorial debut with the crime thriller Dark Country (2009), in which he also starred.

Early life 
Jane was born February 22, 1969, in Baltimore, Maryland, the son of Cynthia (née Jane), an antiques dealer, and Thomas Elliott, Jr., a genetic engineer. He is of Irish, Scottish, and some German-Jewish and Native American descent. He attended Thomas Sprigg Wootton High School but dropped out and moved to Hollywood to pursue an acting career. He was initially homeless and lived out of his car, often doing street performances to earn money: "I had two songs in my repertoire that I hammered to death, 'Hey Joe' and 'Knockin' on Heaven's Door'. People used to pelt me with change just to shut me up."

Career 
Jane began his acting career with the Indian Telugu language film Padamati Sandhya Ragam (1987), directed by Jandhyala. His early roles included the Hustler in I'll Love You Forever … Tonight (1992), Zeph in Buffy the Vampire Slayer (1992), and Billy in Nemesis (1992). He also had supporting roles in several high-profile films, including The Crow: City of Angels (1996), Boogie Nights (1997), The Thin Red Line (1998), Thursday (1998), and Magnolia (1999). After receiving critical acclaim as baseball player Mickey Mantle in 61*, Jane received offers for leading roles beginning with Andre Stander in the South African film Stander (2003), for which he gained further critical acclaim.

Along with director Jonathan Hensleigh and Avi Arad, Jane has said he was the first and only actor to be asked to play the title role in the film The Punisher (2004). He turned down the role twice, as he did not have much interest in the superhero genre. When they asked him the second time to play the Punisher,  Tim Bradstreet's artwork of the character secured his interest.

In addition to starring in the film, he contributed his voice to the video games The Punisher and Gun. He also co-owns RAW, an entertainment company which he runs with Steve Niles and Tim Bradstreet. RAW Studios, the company's comic-book division, released Bad Planet (written by Jane) through Image Comics. Jane became a spokesperson for Niles and the cover model for comic-book character Cal McDonald in 2006. In addition to his screen work, Jane has appeared several times on stage, and received strong critical reviews as Tom in Tennessee Williams' The Glass Menagerie, and as Chris in Arthur Miller's All My Sons. He has also portrayed a fictionalized version of himself in an episode of the television series Arrested Development.

Jane did not return in the planned sequel to The Punisher. Lions Gate Entertainment had approved a direct sequel due to the strong sales of the film on DVD. However, the project lingered in development for over three years. Jonathan Hensleigh completed a first draft of the script before leaving the project in 2006. John Dahl was in talks to direct the film, but cited his dislike of the script and the reduced budget as his reasons for refusing. In a statement on May 15, 2007, and in two audio interviews, Jane said that he pulled out of the project due to creative differences and the studio's further reduction of the budget.

Jane said in June 2007 that Zack Snyder had expressed interest in casting him for the role of the Comedian for the adaptation of Alan Moore's graphic novel Watchmen, but because he was too busy, he turned down the role, which was eventually given to Jeffrey Dean Morgan. The same year he starred in Frank Darabont's adaptation of the Stephen King novella, The Mist. His directorial debut was the 2009 film Dark Country, in which he also played the main character. In 2009, Jane starred with Ving Rhames in the crime film Give 'Em Hell, Malone, which premiered at San Diego Comic Con.

On December 18, 2008, HBO announced it was picking up the black comedy Hung, and Jane was contracted to star in the show. He plays the character of Ray Drecker, a high-school history teacher and basketball coach, who after attending a self-help class while being down on his luck, decides to market the large size of his penis as a path to success. The series was renewed for a second season, which aired in the summer of 2010. The show was renewed for a final season, which aired in fall of 2011.

Jane appeared on the June/July 2010 cover of Men's Fitness magazine. He voiced the character Jonah Hex in an animated short as a companion piece on the Special Edition Blu-ray and two-disc Special Edition DVD release of Batman: Under the Red Hood.

Jane had been set to play the role of a cop in Sylvester Stallone's hitman action film Headshot, but was eventually deemed not "ethnic" enough and let go. In a 2011 interview with Collider, Jane mentioned an upcoming film project, The Lycan. He described this project as a gothic werewolf romance set in a castle in the 18th century.

On June 7, 2012, Jane released a digital EP, Don't Come Home, under the pseudonym Rusty Blades. At the 2012 San Diego Comic-Con International, Jane debuted an independently financed Punisher short film, Dirty Laundry, directed by Phil Joanou and co-starring Ron Perlman.

On February 1, 2017, Syfy began a two-episode debut of the second season of its critically acclaimed "murder mystery in space", The Expanse. Jane portrays the lead role of Detective Joe Miller in this futuristic saga, in which humans have colonized both Mars and the Asteroid Belt, and discover an alien lifeform. The series premiered December 2015, and continued through six seasons, with Jane appearing in the first four of them.

Jane co-starred in Shane Black's The Predator (2018), a direct sequel to the 1987 film Predator and the 1990 film Predator 2.

Personal life 
In 1989, Jane married actress Ayesha Hauer, daughter of Rutger Hauer. The couple starred in a number of films together before they divorced in 1995. They have a son, Leandro Maeder, born on December 14, 1987.

Jane was engaged to Olivia d'Abo from 1998 to 2001. 

After meeting through common friends in 2001, Jane and actress Patricia Arquette became engaged in 2002. Their daughter, Harlow Olivia Calliope, was born on February 20, 2003. Jane and Arquette subsequently married on June 25, 2006, at the Palazzo Contarini del Bovolo in Venice, Italy.

In January 2009, Arquette filed for divorce from Jane on the grounds of irreconcilable differences, but the couple soon reconciled and Arquette sought to abandon the divorce petition on July 9, 2009. However, on August 13, 2010, Jane's representative announced that Jane and Arquette had decided to proceed with a divorce. The divorce was finalized on July 1, 2011. The pair were granted joint custody of their child.

Filmography

Film

Television

Video games

Discography

Albums

Bibliography

Awards

References

External links 

 
 

1969 births
American street performers
American comics writers
American male film actors
American male stage actors
American male television actors
American male video game actors
American male voice actors
American people of Blackfoot descent
American people of German-Jewish descent
American people of Irish descent
American people of Scottish descent
American people who self-identify as being of Native American descent
Arquette family
Jewish American male actors
Living people
Male actors from Baltimore
Native American male actors
20th-century American male actors
21st-century American male actors